Élise Huillery is a French economist. She is a member of the Council of Economic Analysis.

She studied at Paris-Sorbonne University and HEC Paris, and the Paris School of Economics. She teaches economics at the University of Paris-Dauphine, and Sciences Po. She works in several economic fields: development economics, the economics of education, and the history of economics. Her PhD thesis at worked on the economic analysis of French colonialism. She is a member of Abdul Latif Jameel Poverty Action Lab.

Works

References

External links 

 https://dauphine.psl.eu/recherche/cvtheque/huillery-elise
https://sites.google.com/site/elisehuillery/home

Living people
Year of birth missing (living people)
French women economists
Academic staff of the University of Paris
French development economists
French colonial empire
University of Paris alumni
Paris School of Economics